FabricLive.67 is a 2013 DJ mix album by Ben UFO. The album was released as part of the FabricLive Mix Series.

Track list

References

External links
FabricLive 67 at Fabric

Fabric (club) albums
2013 compilation albums